Calcium/calmodulin-dependent 3',5'-cyclic nucleotide phosphodiesterase 1A is an enzyme that in humans is encoded by the PDE1A gene.

References

Further reading